Stephen Buxton (3 February 1888 – 21 April 1953) was an English professional footballer who played as a left back in the Football League for Oldham Athletic and Ashington. He made over 100 Southern League appearances for Brentford and represented the London XI.

Career statistics

References

English footballers
Brentford F.C. players
English Football League players
Association football fullbacks
Southern Football League players
South Bank F.C. players
Oldham Athletic A.F.C. players
People from South Bank, Redcar and Cleveland
1888 births
Darlington F.C. players
Ashington A.F.C. players
Workington A.F.C. players
1953 deaths

Blyth Spartans A.F.C. players